Adrian is a city in the U.S. state of Georgia, in Emanuel and Johnson counties. As of the 2020 census, the city had a population of 552.

The Johnson County portion of Adrian is part of the Dublin Micropolitan Statistical Area.

History
A post office has been in operation at Adrian since 1891. Adrian incorporated in 1899. It is unknown why the name "Adrian" was applied to this community.

Geography
Adrian is located at  (32.531960, -82.590680), at the intersection of U.S. Route 80/Georgia State Route 26 with State Routes 15/78. US 80 leads east  to Swainsboro and west  to Dublin, while Routes 15 and 78 lead south  to Interstate 16 and northwest  to Wrightsville.

Demographics

As of the census of 2010, there were 558 people, 230 households, and 163 families residing in the city. The racial makeup of the city was 69.08% White, 30.57% African American, 0.17% Native American, 0.17% from other races. Hispanic or Latino of any race were 0.69% of the population.

There were 230 households, out of which 29.1% had children under the age of 18 living with them, 47.4% were married couples living together, 19.6% had a female householder with no husband present, and 29.1% were non-families. 26.5% of all households were made up of individuals, and 14.3% had someone living alone who was 65 years of age or older. The average household size was 2.52 and the average family size was 3.06.

In the city, the population was spread out, with 28.0% under the age of 18, 7.1% from 18 to 24, 26.6% from 25 to 44, 20.6% from 45 to 64, and 17.8% who were 65 years of age or older. The median age was 36 years. For every 100 females, there were 81.5 males. For every 100 females age 18 and over, there were 73.0 males.

The median income for a household in the city was $18,281, and the median income for a family was $28,750. Males had a median income of $26,607 versus $21,071 for females. The per capita income for the city was $11,359. About 21.4% of families and 28.2% of the population were below the poverty line, including 46.1% of those under age 18 and 21.7% of those age 65 or over.

Notable person
Izola Curry, assailant who tried to kill Martin Luther King Jr. in 1958, was born in Adrian in 1916.

References

Cities in Georgia (U.S. state)
Cities in Emanuel County, Georgia
Cities in Johnson County, Georgia
Dublin, Georgia micropolitan area